Topola is a village in Kavarna Municipality, Dobrich Province, northeastern Bulgaria.

Honours
Topola Ridge on Davis Coast, Antarctica is named after the village.

References

Villages in Dobrich Province